Callidus Guild is a firm based in Brooklyn, NY. They manufacture hand-painted wallpaper and interior surfaces. Their name is derived from the Latin word Callidus: meaning clever and dextrous. Callidus Guild is a to-the-trade manufacturer, and their work can be seen in Jean de Merry showrooms in New York, Los Angeles, Chicago, and Dallas.

History 

Callidus Guild was founded in 1998 by owner and creative director Yolande Milan Batteau. The firm has been operating out of Brooklyn since 2004. The Sinuous Collection, the first wallpaper collection from C G Wallpaper founded by Christian Batteau and sister Yolande Batteau, was launched in 2004 and patterns Linear, Ribbon, Luster Daub, Boucle, and The Plains - each surface is inspired by natural phenomena. The Sacred Geometries Collection was launched in 2012 and is inspired by natural symmetry and sacred geometry, and includes surfaces Pennant, Folded Origami, and Tessellation.

Critical Acclaim 
Callidus Guild has been praised by many for their high-quality craftsmanship. Elle Décor wrote that Callidus Guild created “some of the world’s most beautiful handmade wallpapers” and were “entrancing the world’s top designers.” Renowned French interior designer Jean-Louis Denoit reflected on how “instant poetry resides in cleverly understated wall finishings.” The Financial Times also deemed their artisanal products “one-of-a-kind.” They have recently been featured in Suited, Huffington Post, Icon Magazine, Finephilia, Interiors Magazine, Architectural Digest, Remodelista, and Design Milk.

Commissions 

Yolande Batteau got her start designing wallpapers for Chanel, and has since traveled globally for the company. Recent commissions include interiors for luxury retailers Tiffany & Co. and Louis Vuitton as well as One Hotel, The Aldyn, One Hotel, Aesa Jewelry and Kwiat Diamonds. Callidus Guild also recently worked with Jean-Louis Denoit and Peter Marino, Axel Vervoordt, David Collins, Steven Gambrell, Robert A. M. Stern, Michael Smith, and John Saladino.

See also
Interior Designers
Wallpaper
Wall Decal

References

Interior design firms
Companies based in Brooklyn